Pierpont Edwards (April 8, 1750 – April 5, 1826) was a delegate to the Congress of the Confederation and was a United States district judge of the United States District Court for the District of Connecticut.

Education and career
Born on April 8, 1750, in Northampton, Province of Massachusetts Bay, British America, Edwards graduated from the College of New Jersey (now Princeton University) in 1768. He entered private practice in New Haven, Connecticut Colony, British America (State of Connecticut, United States from July 4, 1776) starting in 1771. He served in the Continental Army during the American Revolutionary War. He was a member of the Connecticut House of Representatives in 1777, from 1784 to 1785, and from 1787 to 1790, serving as Speaker during his last two years. He was a delegate to the Congress of the Confederation (Continental Congress) from 1787 to 1788. He was a member of the Connecticut convention to ratify the United States Constitution in 1788. He resumed private practice in New Haven from 1790 to 1806.

Federal judicial service

Edwards was nominated by President Thomas Jefferson on February 21, 1806, to a seat on the United States District Court for the District of Connecticut vacated by Judge Richard Law. He was confirmed by the United States Senate on February 24, 1806, and received his commission the same day. His service terminated on April 5, 1826, due to his death in Bridgeport, Connecticut. He was interred at Grove Street Cemetery in New Haven.

Other service
Edwards was a member of the constitutional convention which framed Connecticut's constitution of 1818.

Honor
Pierpont Township, Ashtabula County, Ohio is named for him.

Family

Edwards was the youngest child of theologian Jonathan Edwards. His son, Henry W. Edwards, was Governor of Connecticut and his daughter, Harriett Pierpont Edwards, was married to inventor Eli Whitney.

References

Sources

External links

 

|-

 

1750 births
1826 deaths
18th-century American politicians
19th-century American judges
American people of English descent
Burials at Grove Street Cemetery
Continental Army soldiers
Continental Congressmen from Connecticut
Judges of the United States District Court for the District of Connecticut
Lawyers from Bridgeport, Connecticut
Lawyers from New Haven, Connecticut
People of colonial Massachusetts
Politicians from Bridgeport, Connecticut
Politicians from New Haven, Connecticut
Politicians from Northampton, Massachusetts
Princeton University alumni
Speakers of the Connecticut House of Representatives
United States Attorneys for the District of Connecticut
United States federal judges appointed by Thomas Jefferson